William Keith may refer to:

 William Keith (footballer), Scottish footballer
 William Keith of Galston (died 1336), Scottish soldier during the Wars of Scottish Independence
 William Keith of Delny (died c. 1605), Scottish courtier
 William Keith, 1st Earl Marischal (died 1483), Scottish peer and politician
 William Keith, 4th Earl Marischal (died 1581), Scottish nobleman and politician
 William Keith, 6th Earl Marischal (c. 1585–1635), Scottish peer and naval officer
 William Keith, 7th Earl Marischal (1610–1670/71), Scottish Covenanter
 William Keith, 9th Earl Marischal (c. 1664–1712), Scottish Jacobite politician
 William Keith, 2nd Earl of Kintore (1695–1718), Scottish nobleman
 Sir William Keith, 4th Baronet (1669–1749), Lt. Governor of Pennsylvania and Delaware
 William Keith (artist) (1838–1911), American artist famous for his California landscape paintings
 William John Keith (1873–1937), British colonial administrator
 William Keith (athlete) (1925–1999), South African Olympic runner
 Bill Keith (artist) (1929–2004), American artist
 Bill Keith (musician) (1939–2015), American banjoist
 William H. Keith Jr. (born 1950), American author
 William R. Keith (1929–2009), American businessman and politician

See also

 Bill Keith (disambiguation)
 Keith Williams (disambiguation)
 Keith (disambiguation)
 William (disambiguation)